Edward Medard Park and Preserve, originally known as Pleasant Grove Reservoir Park, is located south of Plant City, Florida, on Turkey Creek Road in Hillsborough County, Florida. The  park just north of Durant, Florida was the site of phosphate mining in the 1960s by the American Cyanamid Company, before the land was donated (largely in 1969). A dike and  reservoir were created in 1970 to provide flood protection along the Alafia River. The lake has a very extensive and irregular shoreline, and great variation is found in the lake bottom as well. The park is maintained by the Hillsborough County Parks and Recreation Department, and has camping, picknicking, and other facilities. Three long piers offer the ability to launch fairly large vessels, although the lake has a no-wake restriction. Additional opportunities for various sports and aquatic activities are available at the popular spot which attracts approximately 250,000 visitors a year.

Reconstruction and restocking

In the early 2000s, the Alafia Basin Board determined that the aging dam was a threat to downstream residents. The lake was almost completely drained in 2010 and closed to fishing for three years due to reconstruction work designed to strengthen the dam and decrease erosion, as well as to add additional amenities including a new boardwalk and a new dock. After the lake was drained, at the urging of state senator Ronda Storms, the tons of tilapia and catfish removed from the reservoir were filleted and distributed to America's Second Harvest, which provided the fillets to local charities to feed the hungry. When the lake reopened in December 2012, it was designated a Fisheries Management Area (FMA) by the Florida Fish and Wildlife Conservation Commission (FWC), with special limits on the number and size of fish that could be taken, and with commercial fishing of tilapia, sailfin catfish, and armored catfish limited to Tuesday through Thursday.  During the construction process, several artificial reefs were installed. During this time, the lake was stocked with 1.2 million fingerling sportsfish, including a quarter-million Florida-strain largemouth bass, plus an additional 6,600 large fish that were relocated from area lakes in 2012.

Features
The park also features a 40 feet tall observation tower overlooking the lake from the Northeast, 42 campsites, and a disc golf course.  The park contains several trails, including both hiking and equestrian trails.  Horses may be rented at the adjacent Turkey Creek Stables. The park levies a $2.00 per vehicle entrance fee, a $5.00 boat launch fee, and a $25.00 canoe/kayak rental fee, with additional fees for camping.

Vegetation

Floating leaf aquatic plants include American Lotus, Water Lettuce, Marsh pennywort, Water spangles, Common Duckweed, Giant Duckweed, and Water Hyacinth. A wide variety of emergent zone plants thrive here, including Wild Taro, Egyptian Paspalidium (watercrown grass), Laurel oak, Muscadine grape, Peruvian Primrose Willow, cattails and many more.

References

External links
Official website

Parks in Hillsborough County, Florida
Reservoirs in Florida
Southwest Florida Water Management District reserves
Lakes of Hillsborough County, Florida
1970 establishments in Florida
Plant City, Florida